Leylak is a 2021 short drama film directed by Scott Aharoni and Dennis Latos and starring Nadir Sarıbacak. The film was written by Mustafa Kaymak. Leylak was shot and edited during the COVID-19 pandemic, in which the film is set.

The film held its world premiere at the 20th Annual Tribeca Film Festival on June 12, 2021, where it won Special Jury Mention in the Best Narrative Short category.

Cast
 Nadir Sarıbacak as Yusuf Çelik
 Isabella Haddock as Renk Çelik
 Gamze Ceylan as Tulay Çelik
 Samrat Chakrabarti as Abdul
 Tony Naumovski as Markus
 Ibrahim Traore as Ibrahim
 Max Schuster as Cemetery Worker
 Mark Lyons as Cemetery Worker
 Onur Usluca as The Digger
 Louis Pearlman as The Digger
 Joseph Fernandez as The Digger

Production

Development and pre-production
During 2020, Aharoni & Latos reached out to Kaymak to conceptualize the film's story, using the emotional and mental impact of the pandemic on society, particularly in its setting of New York City, as the basis. The film is told within a 24 hour period, done to heighten the tension of the plot and intensify the situation the characters face in the midst of the pandemic. Aharoni further explained this, by saying: "We didn’t want the film to remain relevant for this year, or the next, but for many years to come – to remind us all that through grief and hardship, there will always be light at the end of the tunnel."

Filming
Principal photography took place throughout August 2020. Laura Valladao, known for her work on Kevin Wilson Jr.'s Academy Award-nominated short film My Nephew Emmett, served as cinematographer.

Release
The film had its World Premiere at the Tribeca Film Festival on June 12, 2021.

Awards and nominations

References

External links
Official Site
 

2021 films
2021 drama films
American drama short films
Films about the COVID-19 pandemic
Films impacted by the COVID-19 pandemic
Films about death
Films set in Queens, New York
2020s Turkish-language films
2021 multilingual films
American multilingual films
2021 short films
2020s American films